Rafael Freyre is a municipality and town in the Holguín Province of Cuba.

Overview

The main municipal settlement (Rafael Freyre itself) developed around the sugar cane factory "Central Santa Lucía". The only middle school in the area, “ESBU Rafael Freyre Torres,” is attended by a few hundred students from small towns near Los Mineros, La Viuda, Cochico, and other nearby towns.

Some of its most popular destinations are the north coast beaches, such as Playa Guardalavaca and Guardalavaca, which are both natural white sand beaches in the bordering municipality of Banes.

In a small village called Bariay, there is a monument that marks the arrival of Christopher Columbus.

Demographics
In 2004, the municipality of Rafael Freyre had a population of 50,080.

See also
List of cities in Cuba
Municipalities of Cuba

References

External links

Populated places in Holguín Province